
Gmina Brochów is a rural gmina (administrative district) in Sochaczew County, Masovian Voivodeship, in east-central Poland.

Villages
Gmina Brochów contains the villages and settlements of Andrzejów, Bieliny, Brochocin, Brochów, Brochów-Kolonia, Famułki Brochowskie, Famułki Królewskie, Górki, Gorzewnica, Hilarów, Janów, Janówek, Konary, Kromnów, Łasice, Lasocin, Malanowo, Miszory, Nowa Wieś-Śladów, Olszowiec, Piaski Duchowne, Piaski Królewskie, Plecewice, Przęsławice, Sianno, Tułowice, Wilcze Śladowskie, Wilcze Tułowskie and Wólka Smolana.

Neighbouring gminas
Gmina Brochów is bordered by the town of Sochaczew and by the gminas of Czerwińsk nad Wisłą, Kampinos, Leoncin, Młodzieszyn, Sochaczew and Wyszogród.

References
 Polish official population figures 2006

Brochow
Sochaczew County